The National Parks Board (NParks) is a statutory board under the Ministry of National Development of the Government of Singapore.

History 
In November 1989, Minister of National Development, S. Dhanabalan, presented the National Parks Bill in Parliament to form a body to manage the three parks, Singapore Botanic Gardens, Fort Canning Park and Bukit Timah Nature Reserve, in Singapore. In March 1990, Minister of State for National Development, Lee Boon Yang introduced the National Parks Bill in Parliament to form the National Parks Board as a statutory board.

On 6 June 1990, the National Parks Board was formed to manage the three parks.

On 1 July 1996, the Parks and Recreation Department was merged with the National Parks Board.

Since 1 April 2019, all non-food plant and animal-related functions originally under the Agri-Food and Veterinary Authority of Singapore were transferred to NParks under Animal and Veterinary Service (AVS) as part of a reorganisation.

See also 
 List of parks in Singapore

References

External links 
 
 Centre for Urban Greenery and Ecology
 Garden City Fund

1996 establishments in Singapore
Statutory boards of the Singapore Government
Parks in Singapore
Regulation in Singapore